Three ancestral treasures (三樣寶; sān yàng bǎo, 三宗寶; sān zōng bǎo, or 三寶; sān bǎo) refers to  three treasured items coming from a particular region within the culture of China.  Each region has its own three treasures passed down from generations.

List of regional treasures
The following is sorted alphabetically by region:

See also
 Three Treasures (Taoism)
 Three Treasures (traditional Chinese medicine)

References

Chinese culture